İsalı (also, Isaly) is a village and municipality in the Gadabay District of Azerbaijan. It has a population of 1,073. The municipality consists of the villages of Isaly, Gasymaghaly, Dordlar, Mutudere, and Jujanly.

References 

Populated places in Gadabay District